John Renbourn was an English guitarist and composer. His discography consists of 20 studio albums, 5 live albums, 19 compilations, and 2 videos. In addition, his compositions and guitar work have been featured on a number of albums by other artists.

Solo albums
 1965: John Renbourn (Transatlantic Records)
 1966: Another Monday (Transatlantic)
1968: Sir John Alot of Merrie Englandes Musyk Thyng and ye Grene Knyghte (Transatlantic)
 1970: The Lady and the Unicorn (Transatlantic)
 1971: Faro Annie (Transatlantic)
 1973: Heads and Tales (Transatlantic) Compilation - one track only
 1976: The Guitar of John Renbourn (KPM Music) released 2005, a.k.a. The Guitar Artistry of John Renbourn
 1976: The Hermit (Transatlantic)
 1977: A Maid in Bedlam (Transatlantic)
 1979: The Black Balloon (Transatlantic)
 1979: So Early in the Spring (Columbia Records)
 1979: One Morning Very Early (Transatlantic)
 1980: The Enchanted Garden (Transatlantic) with the John Renbourn Group.
 1982: Live in America (Flying Fish Records) with the John Renbourn Group.
1986: The Nine Maidens (Flying Fish Records)
 1988: Folk Blues of John Renbourn (Demon Music Group)
 1988: John Renbourn's Ship of Fools (Transatlantic)
 1996: Lost Sessions (Edsel)
 1998: Traveller's Prayer (Shanachie)
 2006: John Renbourn & Friends (KPM Music Ltd)
 2011: Palermo Snow (Shanachie)

As a member of Pentangle
 1968: The Pentangle (Transatlantic)
 1968: Sweet Child (Transatlantic)
 1969: Basket of Light (Transatlantic)
 1970: Cruel Sister (Transatlantic)
 1971: Reflection (Transatlantic)
 1972: Solomon's Seal (Reprise)
 2016: Finale: An Evening With... (Topic)

Collaborations

With Duck Baker
 1992: A Thousand Words (Acoustic Music)

With Robin Williamson
1992: Wheel of Fortune (Flying Fish)

With Dorris Henderson
 1965: There You Go (Big Beat)
 1967: Watch the Stars (Fontana Records)

With Stefan Grossman
 1978: John Renbourn and Stefan Grossman (Kicking Mule Records)
 1979: Under the Volcano (Kicking Mule)
 1982: Keeper of the Vine: Best of John Renbourn and Stefan Grossman (Shanachie) contains selected tracks from John Renbourn and Stefan Grossman and from Under the Volcano
 1984: Live... In Concert (Shanachie)
 1987: The Three Kingdoms (Sonet)
 1997: Snap a Little Owl (Shanachie) contains 10 tracks from John Renbourn and Stefan Grossman and 3 tracks from Under the Volcano

With Bert Jansch
 1966: Jack Orion (Transatlantic)
 1966: Bert and John (Transatlantic) - re-released with additional tracks by Bert Jansch under the title After the Dance in 1992 on Shanachie
 1982: How To Play Folk Guitar with (Transatlantic) - compilation
 1982: Renbourn & Jansch (Cambra) - compilation

With Wizz Jones
 2016: Joint Control (World Music Network)

Live albums
 1981: Live in America (Flying Fish) with the John Renbourn Group
 1984: Live ... In Concert (Shanachie) with Stefan Grossman
 1993: Wheel of Fortune (Demon) with Robin Williamson
 1998: BBC Live in Concert (Strange Fruit)
 2006: Live in Italy (Libera Informazione Editrice)

Compilations
 1971: The John Renbourn Sampler (Transatlantic)
 1973: So Clear: The John Renbourn Sampler Volume Two (Transatlantic)
 1973: John Renbourn (Reprise) - released in US and Canada
 1979: The Lady And The Unicorn (Transatlantic) - compilation of two albums: Sir John A lot of... and The Lady And The Unicorn
 1980: John Renbourn / Another Monday (Transatlantic) -compilation of two albums
 1986: The Essential Collection Vol 1: The Soho Years (Transatlantic)
1987: The Essential Collection Vol 2: The Moon Shines Bright (Transatlantic)
 1989: A Mediaeval Almanack (Demon / Transatlantic)
 1992: The Essential John Renbourn (Demon)
 1995: Will the Circle Be Unbroken: The Collection (Castle Music)
 1996: The Lady And The Unicorn / The Hermit (Essential / Castle) - compilation of two albums
 1998: Definitive Transatlantic Collection (Transatlantic)
 1999: Collected (Music Club)
 2000: Down on the Barge (Delta)
 2000: The Transatlantic Anthology (Castle)
 2001: Heritage (EMI Plus)
 2001: The Best Of John Renbourn (Castle Pulse)
 2007: Nobody's Fault But Mine: The Anthology  (Transatlantic)
 2015: The Attic Tapes (Riverboat)

Singles
 1972: "The Cuckoo" / "Little Sadie" (Transatlantic)

DVDs
 2004: Rare Performances 1965-1995 (Vestapol)
 2004: John Renbourn & Jacqui McShee in Concert (Vestapol) with Jacqui McShee

Other appearances
 1965: Bert Jansch - It Don't Bother Me (Transatlantic) - guitar on track 7, "My Lover"; track 10, "Lucky Thirteen"
 1966: Bert Jansch - Jack Orion (Transatlantic) - guitar on track 1, "The Waggoner's Lad"; track 3, "Jack Orion"; track 6, "Henry Martin"; track 8, "Pretty Polly"
 1966: Julie Felix - Changes (Fontana) - guitar
 1967: Roy Harper - Sophisticated Beggar (Strike) - guitar
 1972: Wizz Jones - Right Now (Columbia) - production, sitar
 1975: John James - Head In The Clouds (Transatlantic) - guitar on track 1, "Georgemas Junction"; track 5, "Wormwood Tangle"; track 6, "Stranger In The World"
 1976: John James - Descriptive Guitar Instrumentals (Kicking Mule) - guitar on track 2, "New Nothynge"; track 6, "From The Bridge"; track 8, "Guitar Jump"
 1978: John James - In Concert (Kicking Mule) - guitar
 1985: John Paul Jones - Scream for Help (Atlantic Records) - guitar on track 8, "When You Fall In Love"
 1986: Emilio Cao - Amiga Alba E Delgada (Edigal) - guitar
 1999: Larry Conklin - Stranger World (In-Akustik) - guitar
 2001: Wizz Jones - Lucky the Man (Hux Records)
 2001: Roy Harper - Royal Festival Hall Live – June 10th 2001 (Science Friction) - guitar on track 2–4, "Key to the Highway"; track 2–6, "Sophisticated Beggar"

As composer
 1963: Joan Baez - Joan Baez in Concert, Part 2 (Vanguard) - track 1, "Once I Had A Sweetheart" (co-written with Bert Jansch)
 1965: Bert Jansch - It Don't Bother Me (Transatlantic) - track 10, "Lucky Thirteen"
 1969: The Alan Tew Orchestra & Chorus - Let's Fly (CBS) - track 6, "Light Flight" (co-written with Danny Thompson, Jacqui McShee, Bert Jansch, and Terry Cox
 1971: Bert Jansch - Rosemary Lane (Transatlantic) - track 10, "Peregrinations" (co-written with Bert Jansch)
 1973: Davey Johnstone - Smiling Face (Sound City) - track 7, "After the Dance" (co-written with Bert Jansch)
 1974: Bert Jansch - L.A. Turnaround (Charisma Records) - track 9, "Lady Nothing"
 1975: John James - Head In The Clouds (Transatlantic) - track 5, "Wormwood Tangle"
 1976: John James - Descriptive Guitar Instrumentals (Kicking Mule) - track 2, "New Nothynge"; track 6, "From The Bridge"
 1977: Paul Van Suetendael, Eric Melaerts, Didier - 3 Guitars (Best Seller) - track 4, "Lady Nothing"
 1979: Steve Waring and Roger Mason - Guitare Américaine (Spécial Instrumental) - track 9, "Judy"
 1980: The Wildwood Pickers - First Harvest (Clogging Chicken) - track t, "Little Sadie"
 2000: various artists - People on the Highway: A Bert Jansch Encomium (Market Square Records) - track 2–3, "When I Get Home" (co-written with Danny Thompson, Jacqui McShee, Bert Jansch, and Terry Cox) 
 2001: David Williams - Wishmaster 2: Evil Never Dies: Original Motion Picture Score (Beyond Records) - track 4, "Morgana" (co-written with David Williams)
 2003: Gordon Giltrap - Remember This (La Cooka Ratcha) - track 7, "Lady Nothing"
 2004: The Green House Band - Mirage (Market Square Records) - track 3, "The Drifter"
 2004: Jim Ronayne - The Voyage of the Dunbrody (self-released) - track 7, "The Pelican"
 2004: Penelope Houston - Snapshot (Flare Records) - track 2, "I've Got A Feeling" (co-written with Danny Thompson, Jacqui McShee, Bert Jansch, and Terry Cox) 
 2006: Bonobo - Days to Come (Ninja Tune) - track 7, "Hatoa" (co-written with Danny Thompson, Jacqui McShee, Bert Jansch, and Terry Cox) 
 2012: Quantic & Alice Russell with The Combo Bárbaro - Look Around The Corner (Tru Thoughts) - track 3, "Travelling Song" (co-written with Danny Thompson, Jacqui McShee, Bert Jansch, and Terry Cox)
 2013: Méav Ní Mhaolchatha - The Calling (Warner Classics) - track 3, "Light Flight" (co-written with Danny Thompson, Jacqui McShee, Bert Jansch, and Terry Cox)

References

External links 
 Johnrenbourn.co.uk
 John Renbourn website
 
 

Discographies of British artists
Folk music discographies